Kirribilli was an electoral district of the Legislative Assembly in the Australian state of New South Wales, created in 1962, partly replacing Neutral Bay and North Sydney, and named after and including the Sydney suburb of Kirribilli. It was abolished in 1981 and replaced by North Shore.

Members for Kirribilli

Election results

References

Former electoral districts of New South Wales
1962 establishments in Australia
Constituencies established in 1962
1981 disestablishments in Australia
Constituencies disestablished in 1981